Babak Najafi Karami (born 14 September 1975) is an Iranian-Swedish film director, screenwriter, and cinematographer. He is known for directing the 2016 film London Has Fallen.

Biography

Early years 
Najafi was born in Iran, and came to Sweden as a refugee at the age of 11, when his family fled from the Iran–Iraq War. Two of his brothers remained in Tehran, and it took 11 years before they met again. The family settled in Uppsala, where he spent his childhood. Between 1998 and 2002, he studied documentary directing at the Dramatiska Institutet.

Career 
After graduation he wrote and directed a number of acclaimed short films, including the short film comedy Elixir (2004), which he was awarded the Bo Widerberg scholarship. In 2010, he made his directorial debut with the film Sebbe, which won a Guldbagge Award for Best Film, and earned him a nomination as best director at the 46th Guldbagge Awards. At the 60th Berlin International Film Festival, the film was competing in the Generation 14Plus category, for which Najafi won the award for Best First Feature. In 2012, he directed Easy Money II: Hard to Kill, the sequel to the 2010 film Easy Money.

Najafi made his English-language film debut with London Has Fallen (2016), the sequel to the 2013 film Olympus Has Fallen. The film was released to mostly negative reviews, but earned 205.8 million against a 60 million budget.

Filmography

References

External links 

1975 births
Living people
Iranian screenwriters
Iranian film directors
Iranian cinematographers
Swedish screenwriters
Swedish film directors
Swedish cinematographers
Sommar (radio program) hosts
Swedish people of Iranian descent
English-language film directors
Place of birth missing (living people)
Dramatiska Institutet alumni